Galen Bernard Cisco (born March 7, 1936) is an American former baseball player and coach. He was a pitcher in Major League Baseball for three different teams between 1961 and 1969. He was signed by the Boston Red Sox in 1958 out of Ohio State University.

A two-sport star, Cisco earned All-American and All-Big Ten honors and was a captain on the 1957 Ohio State Buckeyes football team, which won the national championship with a 9–1 record, playing both fullback and linebacker. As a pitcher for the Buckeyes, he compiled a career record of 12–2.

Playing career
The 1962 Mets ended up with a record of 40–120, still the record for most losses by a Major League Baseball team in a single season. Cisco, however, posted a .500 record (1–1) in his four late-season appearances for them, including a complete game, 4–1 victory over the Chicago Cubs at the Polo Grounds on September 21. Cisco was a member of the cellar-dwelling Mets for the full seasons of 1963 through 1965, going 18–43 overall with a 4.04 earned run average in 126 games. 

He returned to the Red Sox for part of the 1967 season, then was acquired by the expansion Kansas City Royals, where he finished his active MLB career in 1969. In a seven-season career, he posted a 25–56 record with a 4.56 ERA in 192 appearances, including 78 starts, nine complete games, three shutouts, two saves, and a 1.16 strikeout-to-walk ratio (325-to-281).

Coaching career
Following his playing retirement, Cisco became a pitching coach for the Royals, Montreal Expos, San Diego Padres, Toronto Blue Jays and Philadelphia Phillies, serving for all or parts of 28 years. He spent six seasons with the Blue Jays (1990–1995), helping his team to win three consecutive American League East Division titles (1991–93) and two World Series (1992–93). Under his guidance, Paul Byrd, Robert Person and Randy Wolf developed as starters with the Phillies (1997–2000).

Personal life
Cisco resides in Celina, Ohio.

See also
List of Ohio State University people

References

External links

1936 births
Living people
Allentown Red Sox players
American expatriate baseball people in Canada
Baseball players from Ohio
Boston Red Sox players
Corning Red Sox players
Kansas City Royals coaches
Kansas City Royals players
Louisville Colonels (minor league) players
Major League Baseball pitchers
Major League Baseball pitching coaches
Montreal Expos coaches
New York Mets players
Ohio State Buckeyes baseball players
Ohio State Buckeyes football players
Omaha Royals players
People from St. Mary's, Ohio
People from Celina, Ohio
Philadelphia Phillies coaches
San Diego Padres coaches
Seattle Rainiers players
Toronto Blue Jays coaches
Toronto Maple Leafs (International League) players